The Fabulous Bastard from Chicago is a 1969 feature film directed by Greg Corarito and starring John Alderman, James E. Myers, Maria Lease. It was produced by David F. Friedman. It is a combination of gangster and sexploitation genres, inspired by the success of Bonnie and Clyde (1967).

Premise
During Prohibition, playboy gangster Steve Desmond (John Alderman) owns and operates a liquor distribution company in Chicago.  Rival gangster Fats Percelli (James E. Myers) wants in on his operation, so Desmond sets out to seduce Percelli's daughter.

Cast
 John Alderman as Steve Desmond
 James E. Myers as Carl 'Fats' Percelli 
 Maria Lease as Nancy
 Dan Sonney as Joe the Bartender
 Vicki Carbe as Maria
 Gary Kent as Wes
 Bambi Allen as Spinster O'Mally
 R. Michael Stringer as Skinner 
 Duke Wilmoth as Tom
 Phil Marks as Wally
 Whitey Wozniak as Mr. Thad

Production
The Fabulous Bastard from Chicago was partly filmed at the Spahn Ranch. Barbara Peeters worked on the film as costume designer.

Reception

See also
 List of American films of 1969

References

External links

American exploitation films
American crime thriller films
1960s exploitation films
1960s crime thriller films
1960s English-language films
1960s American films